Jacob "Jake" Deitchler  (born December 1, 1989) is a retired American wrestler who won a position on the United States Olympic Greco-Roman wrestling team in 2008. Deitchler, from Ramsey, Minnesota, is a former University of Minnesota wrestler and is only the third wrestler in history to come directly from high school to earn a spot on the United States Olympic Team.

Competitive history
Deitchler began wrestling in first grade in Coon Rapids, Minnesota and moved to Anoka, Minnesota to wrestle in the sixth grade. This eventually lead to meeting his mentor and coach, Anoka High School alumnus Brandon Paulson. While at Anoka, Deitchler was a three-time Minnesota state wrestling champion.

Deitchler stunned the Greco-Roman wrestling community in the U.S. in 2008 when he won an Olympic berth in the 145.5-pound weight class, becoming the first high school wrestler in 32 years to make the U.S. Olympic team in his sport. In the Beijing Olympics, Deitchler lost both his matches in the 66 kg weight class, the first to the eventual Silver Medalist Kanatbek Begaliev of Kyrgyzstan and Armen Vardanyan of the Ukraine who later received the bronze medal. He finished the Olympics in 12th place in his weight class.

Jake left the Gopher wrestling team briefly to pursue international competition, but returned to the Gophers for the 2009–2010 season, finishing 8–2 in open meets. In January 2010, Deitchler was suspended by the NCAA for the rest of the 2009–2010 for taking $4,000 in prize money while wrestling internationally following the Olympics. He then took the entire 2010–2011 season off after experiencing continued concussion symptoms. After starting the 2011–2012 season ranked as high as 8th nationally in the 157-pound weight class, on January 4, 2012 Deitchler announced that he was retiring from competitive wrestling due to lingering effects from concussions. After receiving his first concussion when he was seven in a dirt bike accident, Deitchler estimates that he had suffered nine to 11 concussions over the last 15 years and was advised by his physician to immediately stop wrestling after experiencing headaches and fogginess following his most recent meet on November 20, 2011.

Deitchler was set to graduate from the University of Minnesota in 2013 with a degree in Communications and American Indian studies. He is also coaching young wrestlers alongside Brandon Paulson and former Gophers wrestler Chad Erikson.

Personal life
Dietchler lives in the Twin Cities suburb of St. Michael, Minnesota with his wife.

References

External links
 

1989 births
Living people
American male sport wrestlers
Olympic wrestlers of the United States
Wrestlers at the 2008 Summer Olympics
Sportspeople from North Dakota
People from Anoka, Minnesota
Anoka High School alumni